Sneed may refer to:

People

Surname
 Carly Fiorina (maiden name "Sneed", born 1954), American businesswoman and politician
 Chris Sneed, American politician
 Christine Sneed, American author
 Cy Sneed (born 1992), American  baseball player
 Ed Sneed (born 1944), American golfer
 Floyd Sneed (born 1942), Canadian drummer
 Joseph Sneed (disambiguation):
Joseph D. Sneed (born 1938), American physicist
Joseph P. Sneed (1804–1881), American Christian minister
Joseph Tyree Sneed III (1920–2008), American jurist
 John Sneed (1861–1898), American baseball player
 L'Jarius Sneed (born 1997), American football cornerback
 Lavinia B. Sneed (1867–1932), American journalist
 Louise Sneed Hill (1862–1955), society leader in Denver, Colorado
 Meg Sneed (born 1982), American LGBT activist
 Omar Sneed American former professional basketball player
 Pamela Sneed, American artist
 R. R. Sneed (1875–1947), American politician
 Richard Sneed, 28th Principal Chief of the Eastern Band of Cherokee Indians
 Richard A. Sneed (1845–1936), American Confederate veteran and politician
 Sam Sneed (born 1968), rap musician
 Troy Sneed (1967–2020), American gospel musician
 William Sneed (disambiguation)
 William Henry Sneed (1812–1869), American politician
 William J. Sneed, (1835–1907), American Confederate veteran, surgeon and educator
 Xavier Sneed, American professional basketball player

Given name
 Sneed B. Collard III (born 1959), American author

Characters
 Shockwave (comics) (Lancaster Sneed), a Marvel Comics character
 Earl Sneed Sinclair, a fictional dinosaur on the TV show Dinosaurs

Other
 Constantine Sneed House, Brentwood, Tennessee, USA
 Judge Sebron G. Sneed House, Fayetteville, Arkansas, USA
 Sneed, Arkansas, a ghost town
 Sneedville, Tennessee
 Sneedsboro, North Carolina, a ghost town
 Sneed's pincushion cactus, the common name for the cactus Escobaria sneedii
 Trying to Save Piggy Sneed, a 1996 short story collection by John Irving
 Sneed's Feed and Seed, a locale and internet meme from 1999 The Simpsons episode "E-I-E-I-(Annoyed Grunt)"

See also
 Boyce–Sneed feud
 Snead (disambiguation)